Microcrambus francescella is a moth in the family Crambidae. It was described by Schaus in 1922. It is found in Hispaniola.

References

Crambini
Moths described in 1922
Moths of the Caribbean